Digital Leather is the musical project led by multi-instrumentalist Shawn Foree. It is recognized for having characteristics of electropunk, new wave, pop, lo-fi, and psychedelic music.

History 
Originally from Yuma, Arizona, Foree began calling his project "Digital Leather" when he moved to Tucson, where he studied American literature at the University of Arizona. He used student loan money to buy equipment. He managed to release his first three albums after recording them in his bedroom on labels such as Tic Tac Totally, Jay Reatard's Shattered Records imprint, and FDH Records. He supported this "bedroom project" with several nationwide and European tours. Sorcerer, released on Goner Records in 2008, is a half-live, half-studio record.

In 2009, friend and fellow musician Jay Reatard took over managing duties for the band. Around this time Foree began working on a collection of songs in a fully operational studio. Released in September 2009 by Fat Possum Records, Warm Brother garnered positive reviews. Pitchfork, for example, referred to Foree as sui generis, calling the album a "charming curio." Reportedly, the label did not initially support the album’s artwork, which features a shirtless man with the album name taped across his chest.

In 2013, Todd Fink of The Faint joined Digital Leather as a full-time keyboardist and additional recording engineer. They spent the next year and a half playing shows around Omaha and preparing a full-length record with the live band recording its own parts (as opposed to Foree recording all the parts himself as was done on previous output). During this time Foree managed to also write and record a split LP with Madison, WI's The Hussy for Southpaw Records.

In 2014, the collaboration between Shawn Foree and The Hussy became the catalyst for Foree and The Hussy's Bobby Hussy to create their synth driven minimal wave duo TIT. The band then began writing and recording their debut self-titled EP 12" over the course five days while Hussy was visiting Foree's home in Omaha. FDH and Volar Records co-released the 12" in late-2014. TIT played their first show in Omaha at O'Leaver's on January 22, 2015 with Todd Fink as an additional keyboardist and Noah Kohll as the drummer. Digital Leather's 9th LP, "All Faded" was recorded by Todd Fink and Clark Baechle of The Faint between 2013 and 2015. All Faded was released by FDH Records in November 2015. A new album, Pink Thunder, was released June 30, 2017.

Selected discography

Albums
 Digital Leather (2003) King Of The Monsters
 Monologue (2006) Shattered
 Hard At Work (2007) Tic Tac Totally
 Blow Machine (2007) FDH Records
 Sorcerer (2008) Goner Records
 Warm Brother (2009) Fat Possum
 Infinite Sun (2011) Volar
 Sponge (2012) Crash Symbols
 Yes Please, Thank You (2012) Southpaw
 Modern Problems (2012) FDH Records
 Split LP w/ The Hussy (2014) Southpaw
 All Faded (2015) FDH Records
 Whack Jam (2015) Kind Turkey Records
 Pink Thunder (2017) FDH Records
 Headache Heaven (2018) No Coast Records
 FEEET (2019) Stencil Trash
 New Wave Gold (2020) No Coast Records
 Tales From The King (2022) Vermin

Singles
 Simulator (2005) Plastic Idol
 Split w/ Angry Angles (2006) Shattered
 She Had A Cameltoe (2007) Goner
 Closed My Eyes (2007) Disordered (Italy), P Trash (Germany), FDH (USA)
 Suckface (2007) Red Lounge (Germany)
 The Assault (2008) Red Lounge (Germany)
 Hurts so Bad, demo version (2009) Squoodge (Austria/Germany)
 Power Surge (2009) FDH
 Lousy Manipulator (2009) Neat Neat Neat
 Sponge (2011) Ghost Highway

Other Projects
 Mere Mortals (2012) Self-released
 Diode (2014) Crash Symbols
 TIT (2014) FDH / Volar
 Dome Valley (2014) Castle Bravo
 Black Bug (2015) Avant!

Featured
 Lost Sounds – Future Touch (2004) In The Red
 Tokyo Electron – S/T (2005) Shattered
 Cutters – 7" (2005) Sunburst
 Terror Visions – World of Shit (2007) FDH
 Devon Disaster – Make Things Bleed (2008) Red Lounge
 Destruction Unit / Black Sunday – Split LP (2008) FDH
 Earthmen & Strangers – S/T (2009) FDH
 Mere Mortals - Purple Fire (2012) Self Released
 The Faint - Doom Abuse (2014)
 The Hussy – Volar EP 7" (2015) Volar

References 

Fat Possum Records artists